The 2022–23 Thai League 2 is the 25th season of the Thai League 2, the second-tier professional league for Thailand's association football clubs, since its establishment in 1997, also known as M-150 Championship due to the sponsorship deal with M-150. A total of 18 teams will compete in the league. The season began on 12 August 2022 and is scheduled to conclude on 27 May 2023.

For this season two teams in the final table (champion and runner up) directly promoted to Thai League 1 next season while teams ranked 3rd – 6th qualified in play off for last spot in top tier next season.

The 1st transfer window is from 25 May to 9 August 2022 while the 2nd transfer window is from 19 December 2022 to 17 January 2023.

Team changes 
The following teams have changed division since the 2022–23 season.

To Thai League 2 

 Uthai Thani
 Krabi
 Nakhon Si United

 Suphanburi
 Samut Prakan City
 Chiangmai United

From Thai League 2 

 Lamphun Warriors
 Sukhothai
 Lampang

  Khonkaen
  Navy

  Muangkan United

Renamed Clubs 
 Customs Ladkrabang United renamed to Customs United

Teams

Stadium and locations

Personnel 
Note: Flags indicate national team as has been defined under FIFA eligibility rules. Players may hold more than one non-FIFA nationality; Club dissolved during season would shown by grey background.

Foreign Players 
Players name in bold indicates the player was registered during the mid-season transfer window.

{| class="wikitable sortable" style="font-size:100%;"
|-
! style="width:10%"|Club
! style="width:10%"|Player 1
! style="width:10%"|Player 2
! style="width:10%"|Player 3
! style="width:10%"|Asian Player
! style="width:10%"|ASEAN Player
! style="width:11%"|Former
|-
| Ayutthaya United
|  Nilson
|  Thiago Duchatsch
|  Simon Dia
|  Kazuki Murakami
|   Sithu Aung
|  Gustavinho
|-
|Chainat Hornbill
|  Diego Silva
|  Greg Houla
|  Wellington Priori
|  Kim Byung-oh
|
|  Dennis Nieblas   Choe Hoju
|-
|Chiangmai
|  Veljko Filipović
|  Kim Bo-yong
|  Yuta Hirayama
|  Lim Chang-gyoon
|  Ryhan Stewart
|  Stênio Júnior
|-
|Chiangmai United
|  Deyvison Fernandes de Oliveira
|  Evson Patrício
|  Melvin de Leeuw
|  Yuto Ono
|  Iain Ramsay
|  Bill   Oliver Bias
|-
|Customs United
|  Alexandre Balotelli
|  Adnan Orahovac
|  David Cuerva
|  Daisuke Sakai
|  Aung Kaung Mann
|  Miguel Clarino
|-
|Kasetsart
|  Adalgisio Pitbull
|  Mateus Totô
|  Esoh Paul Omogba
|  Park Hyun-woo
|  Stuart Wark
|  Kim Hong   Soe Moe Kyaw
|-
|Krabi
|  Hamed Bakhtiari
|  Choe Hoju
|  Chigozie Mbah
|  Badar Al-Alawi
|  Suan Lam Mang
|  Victor Oliveira   Pedro Rodrigues
|-
|NakhonPathom Utd
|  Peter Sørensen Nergaard
|  Jhonatan Bernardo
|  Sam Obed Kofi
|  Amirali Chegini
|  Phithack Kongmathilath
| Mohamed Essam
Abdolreza Zarei
|-
|Nakhon Si United 
|  Evandro Paulista
|  Phillerson
|  Aleksandar Kapisoda
|  Fareed Sadat
|  Mark Hartmann
|  Kim Bong-jin   Nyein Chan Aung
|-
|Phrae United
|  Elivélton
|  Marlon Da Silva
|  Rodrigo Maranhão
|  Taku Ito
|
|
|-
|Rajpracha 
|  Danilo Oliveira
|  Mohamed Sidibe
|  Victor
|  Koki Narita
|  Pete Forrosuelo
|  Ibrahim Konaré   Makan Diawara
|-
|Ranong United
|  Gabriel do Carmo|   Julius Chukwuma
|  Selwan Al-Jaberi|  Yusaku Yamadera
|  Aung Kyaw Naing
|  Barry Lelouma   Nyein Chan
|-
| Rayong
|  Florent Obama
|  Tiago Chulapa|  Rafael Galhardo|  Seiya Sugishita
|  Lwin Moe Aung
|  Yeon Gi-sung   Anto Okamura
|-
| Samut Prakan City
|  Makan Diawara|  Mohamed Toure|  Evans Aneni
|  Sho Shimoji 
|  Zon Moe Aung|  Renan Costa   Petru Leucă   Evans Damian Aneni
|-
| Suphanburi
|  Douglas Tardin
|  Matheus Souza
|  João Paulo|  Lee Jong-cheon
|
|  Seiya Kojima
|-
| Trat
|  Mohamed Essam|  Tãua Ferreira
|  Valdo
|  Hiromichi Katano
|  Soukaphone Vongchiengkham
|  João Paulo
|-
|Udon Thani
|  Matheus Vieira da Silva|  Arnold Suew
|  Flodyn Baloki
|  Edgar Bernhardt| 
|  Greg Houla   Jo Sang-bum   Aung Kaung Mann
|-
|Uthai Thani 
|  Brinner|  Ricardo Santos
|  Steeven Langil|  Kento Nagasaki
|  Hikaru Minegishi|  Carlos Damian   Adefolarin Durosinmi Zafuan Azeman
|-
|}

Dual Citizenship/Heritage Players
Overseas Thai players whom have obtained a Thai passport are regarded as local players.Notes:'  Carrying Thai heritage.
  Capped for Thailand.

 League table 
 Standings 

 Positions by round 

 Results by match played 

 Results 

 Season statistics 
 Top scorers As of 19 March 2023. Hat-tricks 

 Clean sheets As of 12 March 2023.''

Attendances

Overall statistical table

Attendances by home match played

See also 
 2022–23 Thai League 1
 2022–23 Thai League 3
 2023 Thailand Amateur League
 2022–23 Thai FA Cup
 2022–23 Thai League Cup
 2022 Thailand Champions Cup

References

External links 
 Official website 
 Football Association of Thailand 

Thai League 2 seasons